The Maritime Women's Football League (MWFL) is a Canadian football league in eastern Canada. It was Canada's first all-female full-contact football competition when it began operating in 2004.

Since it was established, the League has grown from two to four teams. They hail from the three major cities of New Brunswick (Fredericton, Moncton, and Saint John) along with a team from Halifax, Nova Scotia. A fifth team, on Prince Edward Island, played in the 2019 MWFL season before the COVID-19 pandemic.

The current MWFL title holders are the Halifax Xplosion and Saint John Storm, who tied the 2022 championship game in triple overtime and shared the title.

Teams
Fredericton Nissan Lady Gladiators Fredericton New Brunswick (Team Website)
Halifax Xplosion Halifax Nova Scotia
Saint John Storm Saint John New Brunswick
Moncton Vipers Moncton New Brunswick
PEI Island Demons Prince Edward Island, Canada (on hiatus)

History
The league was founded in 2004 as the New Brunswick Women’s Football League, NBWFL. In 2006, it changed to its present name, the MWFL, when Halifax joined the competition.

Football Canada wrote, "With many obstacles to overcome the growth of the league was slow and at times discouraging. New teams needed enough money to buy all new equipment, or share with teams." The Maritime league became part of the Junior Player Development Program of Football Canada.

The MWFL marked its tenth anniversary in 2014, when the season schedule was moved forward, earlier in the year, to play its seasons from April to June.

Since the MWFL began, the Western Women's Canadian Football League and Central Canadian Women's Football League have also been established in other regions of the country.

Modified rules
In the MWFL, the playing field is a regulation Canadian football field, 65 yards wide, but offences are permitted four downs (rather than the usual three) to move the ball forward 10 yards. The one-yard neutral zone is the same as in regular Canadian football. Instead of 12 players per side, MWFL teams play with 11 per team according to the league's 2012 rules. As of 2012, the four timed quarters are each 12 minutes long ordinarily, but 15 minutes long in the final two weeks of the regular season. The league's former rules in 2007 stipulated that games were played with 10 players per team, in four quarters of 10 minutes each.

League champions
The league championship is known as the SupHer Bowl, while the championship trophy is known as the Judy Upward Trophy.

References

External links
 League Facebook homepage
 League Twitter page
 Bleacher Report preview of the tenth season, 2013
 Original MWFL official site Last recorded May 3, 2012 (Web Archive)

Canadian football leagues
2004 establishments in Canada
Sports leagues established in 2004
Women's American football leagues
Professional sports leagues in Canada